Donato Pavesi (August 19, 1888 – June 30, 1946) was an Italian track and field athlete who competed in racewalking in the 1920 Summer Olympics and in the 1924 Summer Olympics.

Biography
Born in Milan (Italy) on the 19 August 1888,  he was an extraordinary walker, especially on long distances. 
He won six times the famous yearly 100 kilometres racewalk between 1908 and 1939, also establishing the world record in the 1922 edition, with a time of 9.51’39’’ . He won other classic racewalks, such as the London-Brighton (8h 26' 23 in the  1921 edition and 8h 37' 27 in the 1923 edition), the Manchester-Liverpool, the Manchester-Blackpool or the 20 Miles of London at Stamford Bridge -

In 1920 he took part to the Summer Olympic Games in Antwerp and was disqualified in the 3 km racewalk final as well as in the 10 km final. Four years later he finished fourth in the 10 km competition at the Paris Games.

In 1927 he established the world record of Men's 20 kilometres walk with a time of 1.37’42’’2. He died in 1946 during a veteran racewalk.

Achievements

See also
Italy at the 1920 Summer Olympics
Italy at the 1924 Summer Olympics

References

External links
 

1888 births
1946 deaths
Italian male racewalkers
Olympic athletes of Italy
Athletes (track and field) at the 1920 Summer Olympics
Athletes (track and field) at the 1924 Summer Olympics
Athletes from Milan